Vigilante Hideout is a 1950 American Western film directed by Fred C. Brannon, written by Richard Wormser, and starring Allan Lane, Eddy Waller, Roy Barcroft, Virginia Herrick, Cliff Clark and Don Haggerty. It was released on August 6, 1950, by Republic Pictures.

Plot
Currently on YouTube.

Cast
Allan Lane as Rocky Lane 
Black Jack as Black Jack
Eddy Waller as Nugget Clark
Roy Barcroft as Muley Price
Virginia Herrick as Marigae Sanders
Cliff Clark as Howard Sanders
Don Haggerty as Jim Benson
Paul Campbell as Ralph Barrows
Guy Teague as Blackie 
Art Dillard as Henchman Pete

References

External links 
 

1950 films
American Western (genre) films
1950 Western (genre) films
Republic Pictures films
Films directed by Fred C. Brannon
Films adapted into comics
American black-and-white films
1950s English-language films
1950s American films